Psalmopoeus  is a genus of the family Theraphosidae containing various species of   tarantulas. The genus is native to Trinidad and Tobago, Colombia, Ecuador, Venezuela, Guyana, Brazil, Belize, Panama, Nicaragua, Costa Rica, Mexico, Guatemala and Honduras. All of these tarantulas are arboreal in nature, Psalmopoeus victori being the first arboreal tarantula of Mexico.

Venom 
These species are believed to be relatively venomous, and research in the venom of P. cambridgei shows it to be similar to capsaicin, the molecule causing irritation in chilli peppers. These molecules activate sensory cells to send pain signals to the brain. Genetic engineers are working on blocking the receptors that are activated by these molecules.

Diagnosis 
The species of this genus can be distinguished from all others by the lyriform organ in the prolateral maxillae, composed of a singular row of thick hairlike bristles. They also own hairs on the base of the chelicerae, also having short hairs in the retrolateral side of the pedipalp trochanter and femur.

List of species
, the World Spider Catalog accepted the following species:
Psalmopoeus cambridgei Pocock, 1895 (type species) – Trinidad and Tobago 
Psalmopoeus ecclesiasticus Pocock, 1903 – Colombia and Ecuador
Psalmopoeus emeraldus Pocock, 1903 – Colombia
Psalmopoeus irminia Saager, 1994 – Venezuela, Guyana and Brazil
Psalmopoeus langenbucheri Schmidt, Bullmer & Thierer-Lutz, 2006 – Venezuela
Psalmopoeus maya Witt, 1996 - Belize
Psalmopoeus plantaris Pocock, 1903 – Colombia
Psalmopoeus pulcher Petrunkevitch, 1925 – Panama and Colombia
Psalmopoeus reduncus (Karsch, 1880) –  Nicaragua, Costa Rica and Panama
Psalmopoeus victori Mendoza, 2014 – Mexico, Guatemala and Honduras

In synonymy 

 Psalmopoeus copanensis Gabriel & Sherwood, 2020 = Psalmopoeus victori 
 Psalmopoeus intermedius Chamberlin, 1940 = Psalmopoeus reduncus 
 Psalmopoeus petenensis Gabriel & Sherwood, 2020 = Psalmopoeus victori 
 Psalmopoeus rufus Petrunkevitch, 1925 = Psalmopoeus pulcher 
 Psalmopoeus sandersoni Gabriel & Sherwood, 2020 = Psalmopoeus victori

Nomen dubium 

 Psalmopoeus affinis Strand, 1907 - West Indies

References

External links

 Giant Spiders

Theraphosidae
Spiders of Mexico
Spiders of Central America
Spiders of South America
Theraphosidae genera